Tikiapara is a residential as well as semi-industrial neighbourhood of Central Howrah in Howrah district of West Bengal, India. It is adjacent to Kadamtala and Howrah Maidan. Tikiapara is a part of the area covered by Kolkata Metropolitan Development Authority (KMDA).

Tikiapara also has a railway station by its name. The economy of this region is dependent on the iron and casting industry mostly small and medium-sized, while large part of the population serve as a work force for businesses located in Kolkata.

Tikiapara is under the jurisdiction of Howrah Police Station of Howrah City Police. It also has local Police Station namely Tikipara Police Station located in Fari.

Railway colony
There is a big railway colony built during late nineteenth century along Tikiapara railway station beside Sailen Manna Street (Formerly Bypass Road). It is managed by South Eastern Railway. The station code is TKPR. It is the next station of Howrah Station on South Eastern line. It is a flood-prone area. Although no express train stops at this station, all local and passenger trains stop at Tikiapara.

Places of attraction

The most attractive place of Tikiapara is the Belilious Park, an amusement park. As of now, it is opened only for morning joggers, within the park there is a pond and the trees around here provide greenery to the region. A marriage hall is also present here for marriage events. A new tower is also under construction namely "Panchdeeep Tower", which after construction will be the tallest Structure in the whole city of Howrah.

Food

This region has a lot of biryani shops selling mutton, chicken and beef biryani. It also has small shops selling puri, samosa, kabab, pakora and rolls. Sweets are also available in many shops. With such a variety of food available it depicts the cosmopolitan environment of Tikiapara assimilating cuisines of Muslims, Hindus and Bengalis.

People

Tikiapara is a region of mixed cultures and languages with Muslim community forming a majority of the population. Most Muslims live in the central part of Tikiapara starting from Bibi Majid continuing till Fari.

While Hindus are concentrated mostly on the outskirts of in and around the central Tikiapara region mentioned above. Most north Indian Hindus (Biharis and Marwaris) are  concentrated in the Ashu Bose Lane region and Bengali Hindus residing west of Belilious Park till Kadamtala. 
The most widely spoken languages here are Hindi, Urdu and Bengali. While most of the people are able to understand and speak in Bengali as well.

Generally, Tikiapara can be divided into two parts i.e. north and south Tikiapara with Belilious Road intersecting it into two uneven parts. There are lot of small scale industries in and around the fringes of Tikiapara. Majority of them are foundry and casting industry. Iron and steel products making small scale factories are also present. Small Printing presses can also be found.

Development is happening at a rapid  rate. Income diversification is a key to people's growth. Literacy  rate is also on the upward  slope with more parents encouraging their children to basic education.

Level of hygiene has drastically improved. Rapid urbanization changed people's perspective.

Education
The oldest educational institution of Tikiapara is Howrah Muslim High School which is serving the basic requirements of primary, secondary and higher secondary education. The medium of instruction is basically Urdu. However, English and Bengali are also used as second and third language. 
St Joseph day school, Holy child and  Sacred heart are the English medium schools.

Upper Middle Families tend to send their kids to St. Thomas church or Maria's Day School.

Now the educational system is being refined with lot of young children attending schools. The newly opened Narayana School provides high class primary and secondary and Higher Education in science stream as well.

Other educational institutions of Tikiapara include Sir Syed Ahmed High School, Tikiapara Muslim Girls High School and some other primary schools. The future of English-based education is being nourished under the tender roofs of Samaritan Mission School and Rebecca Belilious Institution, initiated by notable social worker Mamoon Sir. The institution has been granted the status of a High School and efforts are on to concretize this idea of establishing a school having all three streams- arts, commerce and science.

References 

Slums of West Bengal
Neighbourhoods in Howrah
Cities and towns in Howrah district
Neighbourhoods in Kolkata
Kolkata Metropolitan Area